Kannur Squad is an upcoming Indian Malayalam-language investigative thriller film directed by Roby Varghese Raj, in his directorial debut, written by Muhammad Shafi and Rony David Raj, and produced by Mammootty under Mammootty Kampany. It stars Mammootty in the lead role.

Principal photography began in January 2023. The film's title and first look poster was announced on 26 January 2023.  The music is composed by Sushin Shyam.

Production 
On 27 December 2022, Mammootty Kampany announced their fourth production would be directed by debutant Roby Varghese Raj through social media. He had earlier worked as cinematographer for films like Puthiya Niyamam (2016) and The Great Father (2017). The title Kannur Squad was announced on 26th January 2023, along with the first look posters and crew list. Mammootty had joined the film's set on January 1, 2023.

References